Nellie Neilson (April 5, 1873 – May 26, 1947) was an American historian. She was the first female president of the American Historical Association and the first woman to have an article published in the American Historical Review.

Biography
Neilson was born in Philadelphia, Pennsylvania to William George Neilson (a metallurgical engineer) and Mary Louise Neilson. She attended Bryn Mawr College, from which she received an A.B. in 1893, an A.M. in 1894, and a Ph.D. in 1899. She studied under Charles McLean Andrews at Bryn Mawr, and spent a year of her Ph.D. studies in England, where she studied under Frederic Maitland and Paul Vinogradoff. Neilson would later credit Andrews with encouraging her to study history rather than English literature.

She taught at Agnes Irwin School in Philadelphia from 1897 to 1900, and lectured at Bryn Mawr from 1900 to 1902. In 1902 she moved to Mount Holyoke College as an instructor in history, and in 1904 was appointed professor of European history there. She rose to the rank of full professor in 1905, and stayed in that position until retiring from teaching in 1939. Neilson graduated from Bryn Mawr – and later worked at Holyoke – with fellow medievalist Bertha Putnam.

In 1926 she was elected a fellow of the Medieval Academy of America, the first woman so elected; and in 1943 she served as the president of the American Historical Association, the first woman to do so.

She died in 1947 in South Hadley, Massachusetts.  She is interred at West Laurel Hill Cemetery in Bala Cynwyd, Pennsylvania.

Scholarly work
Neilson's first major work was her doctoral dissertation, Economic Conditions on the Manors of Ramsey Abbey, in which she investigated the economic affairs of the lands held by Ramsey Abbey in the Middle Ages. She continued to be primarily concerned with the development of rural medieval England thereafter. She edited three surveys of the lands owned by English monasteries, focusing particularly on the economic and social conditions surrounding them. In addition, she wrote some volumes for nonspecialists and some works on medieval legal systems.

Selected works
 Economic Conditions on the Manors of Ramsey Abbey (1899)
 Customary Rents (1910)
 Survey of the Honour of Denbigh (1914)
 The Terrier of Fleet Lincolnshire (1920)
 The Cartulary of Bilsington Kent (1927)
 Mediaeval Agrarian Economy (1936)

References

 
 
 

1873 births
1947 deaths
American medievalists
Women medievalists
Mount Holyoke College faculty
Bryn Mawr College alumni
American women academics
Presidents of the American Historical Association
Writers from Philadelphia
Fellows of the Medieval Academy of America
Historians from Pennsylvania
American women historians
19th-century American historians
19th-century American women writers
20th-century American historians
20th-century American women writers